Linda Liepiņa (born 8 October 1974 in Riga) is a Latvian businesswoman and politician. She is a former Member of the Thirteenth Saeima of Latvia (elected from the For a Humane Latvia party, but resigned). She currently represents the "Latvia First" party, which she co-founded in 2021. She has also lived and worked in France.

Liepina graduated from the Baltic Russian Institute (now known as the Baltic International Academy) in 2005, obtaining a professional master's degree in business management and administration.

In 2016, Liepiņa joined the party "Who Owns the State" and in 2018 was elected to the 13th Saeima on the KPV LV list.  In 2019, L. Liepiņa left the KPV LV party and its Saeima faction, and in the future she will work in the Saeima as an independent opposition MP. She chaired the 13th Saeima's Requests Committee from the beginning of its work until September 2019.

References 

1974 births
Living people
Politicians from Riga
Who Owns the State? politicians
Latvia First politicians
Deputies of the 13th Saeima
Deputies of the 14th Saeima
Political party founders
Latvian women in business
21st-century Latvian women politicians
Women deputies of the Saeima